The Cowanesque River is a  tributary of the Tioga River in Potter and Tioga counties, Pennsylvania, and Steuben County, New York, in the United States. It joins the Tioga River soon after crossing from Pennsylvania into New York, near the borough of Lawrenceville, Pennsylvania.

The name of the Cowanesque River is of Native American origin, derived either from Go-wan-is-que ("briary or thorn bushy"), or from Ka-hwe-nes-ka ("on the long island").

In Tioga County, the Cowanesque Dam was constructed by the US Army Corps of Engineers in 1980. The dam created Cowanesque Lake, which helps prevent flooding within the valley. The  lake also facilitates various forms of recreation; the Tompkins Recreation Area and Campground is located along the lake's north shore, and the south shore hosts two day-use areas.

See also
List of rivers of New York
List of rivers of Pennsylvania

References

External links
US Army Corps of Engineers: Cowanesque Lake Trails
U.S. Geological Survey: PA stream gaging stations

Rivers of New York (state)
Rivers of Pennsylvania
Tributaries of the Chemung River
Rivers of Steuben County, New York
Rivers of Potter County, Pennsylvania
Rivers of Tioga County, Pennsylvania
Pennsylvania placenames of Native American origin